Tehosekoitin was a Finnish rock band formed in 1991. The band made music with traditional rock 'n roll attitude. Besides pure rock 'n roll, they also made some songs which were more like jazz, blues or tender ballads than actual rock. Tehosekoitin was really popular in Finland. After a successful decade in Finland the band toured under the new name Screamin' Stukas in Britain and Europe. They translated all their lyrics into English. The tour wasn't very successful.

Tehosekoitin released their first three singles "Greatest Hits II", "...ja valtakunnassa kaikki hyvin!!!?" (....and everything's well in the kingdom!!!?) and "T.S. <3 A.L" (Tehosekoitin loves Apulanta) in vinyl, playing Finnish-style punk.

After those recordings Tehosekoitin changed their style into more traditional rock and made their first CD "Rock'n'roll"(1994) as they were starting to have some success in Päijänne Tavastia.

Tehosekoitin became known in whole Finland in 1997 with their single "C'mon baby yeah". After that they released "Köyhät syntiset" and the success was guaranteed.

Tehosekoitin released also "Varoittava esimerkki"(1998), "Freak Out"(1999), Rock 'n' Roll Monster Movie Show"(2000), "Rakkauden Gangsterit"(2001) and "Golden Greats"(2002).

In 2002 they published a CD "A lotta rhythm" in English with the name "Screamin' Stukas".
CD-single "Lupaan"(2004) became the last Tehosekoitin recording ever been published and they played their last gig in August 2004. A reunion tour has been announced for 2009.

Nowadays their singer Otto Grundström has also become known as a poet. He also featured as lead vocalist on the single "Rakkaus repii meidät kappaleiksi" By the Finnish punk rock group Pää Kii in 2012.

Members

1991–1992 

 Janne ”Jansku” Kuusela, vocals
 Henry "Henkka" Hagert, drums
 Hannu ”Hanski” Kilkki, bass
 Matti Mikkola, guitar

1992–1999
 Otto Grundström, vocals
 Ari ”Arska” Tiainen, guitar
 Hannu ”Hanski” Kilkki, bass
 Matti Mikkola, drums

1999–2001
 Otto Grundström, vocals
 Ari ”Arska” Tiainen, guitar
 Hannu ”Hanski” Kilkki, bass
 Matti Mikkola, guitara
 Tero Sundell, drums

2001–2004
 Otto Grundström, vocals
 Hannu ”Hanski” Kilkki, bass
 Matti Mikkola, guitar
 Tero Sundell, drums
 Juha Kuoppala, keyboard

Discography

Albums
 1994 Rock'n Roll
 1997 Köyhät syntiset
 1998 Varoittava esimerkki
 1999 Freak Out
 2000 Rock 'n' Roll Monster Movie Show
 2001 Rakkauden gangsterit
 2002 Golden Greats
 2002 A Lotta Rhythm — International sales title: Screamin' Stukas
 2009 Kaikki nuoret tyypit

Singles & EPs
 1992 Greatest Hits II
 1993 ... Ja valtakunnassa kaikki hyvin!!!?
 1994 Yö ulkona
 1995 T12VM
 1996 Se johtuu geeneistä '96 (demo)
 1996 Kadonneet pojat
 1997 C'mon Baby Yeah
 1997 Syntynyt köyhänä
 1997 Hyvä karma
 1998 Pillitä, Elli, pillitä
 1998 Pakko päästä pois
 1999 Asfaltti polttaa (demo)
 1999 Keskiyön tanssi/Laura
 1999 Valonkantaja
 2000 Kaikki nuoret tyypit
 2000 Pyydä tähdet taivaalta
 2001 Maailma on sun (demo)
 2001 Kaukaisimmalle rannalle
 2001 Kaikki on mahdollista
 2004 Lupaan

DVD
 2002 Vauhdissa - Live-DVD

External links
 Tehosekoitin: label homepage and forum 

Finnish punk rock groups